The Future in Whose Eyes? is the third studio album by British progressive metal band Sikth, their first full-length album since their 2008–2013 hiatus, following their return EP Opacities (EP). It was released worldwide on 2 June 2017. It is the first and only album to feature new vocalist Joe Rosser, who replaced vocalist Justin Hill in 2016. The album was released on CD, vinyl, and digital formats.

Track listing

Personnel

Music
Mikee Goodman – vocals
Joe Rosser – vocals
Dan Weller – guitars
Graham "Pin" Pinney – guitars
James Leach – bass
Dan "Loord" Foord – drums, percussion

Production
Produced by Dan Weller
Mixed by Adam "Nolly" Getgood
 Mastered by Ermin Hamidovic
Vocals engineered at R&R Studios
Guitars, bass and drums engineered at Monkey Puzzle House Studios
Artwork and design by Meats Meier
Additional vocals on "Cracks of Light" by Spencer Sotelo (Periphery)

Charts

References

Sikth albums
2017 albums
Peaceville Records albums
Albums produced by Dan Weller